The NWA Brass Knuckles Championship was a professional wrestling championship sanctioned by the National Wrestling Alliance, contested for in hardcore matches.  As it was a professional wrestling championship, it was won not by actual competition, but by a scripted ending to a match.

Various NWA territories have promoted a  Brass Knuckles championship over the years:
NWA Texas Brass Knuckle Championship  Promoted by NWA Big Time Wrestling from 1953 to 1982
WCCW Texas Brass Knuckle Championship  Promoted by World Class Championship Wrestling from 1982 to 1985
WCWA Brass Knuckles Championship  Promoted by World Class Wrestling Association from 1986 to 1987
NWA Brass Knuckles Championship  promoted by NWA Southwest from 1998 to 1999
NWA Texas Hardcore Championship  promoted by NWA Southwest from 1999 to 2001

See also
List of National Wrestling Alliance championships

Footnotes

References

National Wrestling Alliance championships
Hardcore wrestling championships
Regional professional wrestling championships
Professional wrestling in Texas